Events in the year 1393 in Norway.

Incumbents
Monarch: Eric III (along with Margaret)

Events
Sacking of Bergen by the Victual Brothers. The Munkeliv Abbey at Nordnes suffered great damage from the attack.

Arts and literature

Births

Deaths

References

Norway